This is a 2018 timeline of events in the Somali Civil War (2009–present).

January 
 January 5 - An African Union peacekeeper was killed, and two others were wounded in a landmine explosion in Buloburde District. Two men, including a prominent local traditional elder have been assassinated by suspected Al-Shabaab militants in Afgoye district in Lower Shabelle. Assailants shot and killed two civilians at Koodka neighbourhood in Mogadishu.
 January 8 - At least two Somali soldiers were injured in a grenade attack on an army checkpoint outside Beledweyne, the regional capital of Hiran.
 January 9 - A bomb explosion in the heart of Mogadishu, the Somali capital has wounded at least three government soldiers aboard a military vehicle.
 January 11 - One civilian was killed and several were wounded after mortar rounds landed near the Presidential Palace in Mogadishu.
 January 14 - Five Somali soldiers were wounded when their military vehicle hit a landmine in Mogadishu. Al-Shabaab fighters attacked a remote Somali army base north of the capital Mogadishu, killing at least two Somali government soldiers.
 January 23 - Four people have been killed and six others wounded in a remote-controlled improvised explosive device explosion near Mogadishu.
 January 27 - Al-Shabaab militants have shot and killed an assistant judge in Wanlaweyn district in Somalia's Southern Lower Shabelle region.
 January 29 - A Somali army colonel and three soldiers were killed following an attack on a convoy by Al-Shabaab militants in Bay region in Southern Somalia.
 January 30 - A roadside bomb hit a military vehicle carrying Puntland soldiers in the vicinity of Galgala hills of Bari region, killing at least one soldier, wounding 3 others.

February 
 February 1 - A roadside bomb explosion killed at least three people and wounded two others in an area outside Mogadishu, the Somali capital.
 February 4 - Four people have been killed and five others injured in a bomb explosion inside a house in the Somali capital Mogadishu.
 February 5 - Assailants have shot and killed a former district commissioner in Beledweyne, the regional capital of Hiran province in central Somalia.
 February 6 - Five soldiers were wounded in an overnight attack on a police station in Bosaso, the main commercial city of the northeastern semi-autonomous region of Puntland. Two people were killed in an attack on a police station by Al-Shabaab militants in Jalalaqsi town in Hiran region of central Somalia. Three people were killed in separate shootings in Mogadishu by Al-Shabaab assassins.
 February 7 - A senior Somali military officer was assassinated in Mogadishu, the Somali capital. Five Somali soldiers were killed and four others wounded in a roadside explosion in Afgooye district in Lower Shabelle region.
 February 10 - Al-Shabaab militants attacked Afgooye town, about 30 km southwest of Mogadishu. Three civilians were injured in the attack.
 February 12 - Two Kenyans have been stabbed to death by Al-Shabaab fighters for allegedly spying for Somalia and Kenyan intelligence services in Qunyo Barrow town, Lower Shabelle region.
 February 15 - One person has been injured after an explosive device attached to his vehicle went off in Waberi district.
 February 16 - At least two Puntland soldiers were killed in a roadside bomb blast in Galgala Mountains of Bari region. Another was injured in the attack.
 February 23 - At least 45 people were killed and 36 others injured in two car bombings and subsequent gunfire in Mogadishu. Five attackers were also killed in the attack.

March 
 March 1 - At least three people were killed and three others were wounded when a suicide car bomb blast targeted a security checkpoint in Sinka Dher on the outskirts of the Somali capital Mogadishu. Another three people were killed and two injured in a mortar attack in the Somali capital Mogadishu.
 March 2 - A suicide bomber rammed his explosives-laden minibus into a military camp in Afgooye, a district in Lower Shabelle region, killing at least 5 Somali soldiers and wounding several others. 6 other government soldiers died after a remote-controlled landmine targeted a convoy carrying injured soldiers from Afgooye to Mogadishu. At least three Burundian soldiers of the African Union Mission to Somalia were killed in an Al-Shabaab attack near Jowhar, Somalia. Seven others were injured, four were still missing, and one armoured vehicle and four trucks were damaged during the attack.
 March 10 - At least four members of the Somali security force were killed and another injured in a remote-controlled improvised explosive device attack on the outskirts of Mogadishu.
 March 11 - Al-Shabaab assailants have shot and killed at least three people in Mogadishu, the Somali capital.
 March 12 - At least one soldier was killed and several others were wounded in Mogadishu in a shootout between Somali security forces and Al-Shabaab militants.
 March 14 - Two Puntland bomb disposal experts were killed in a roadside bomb explosion in the Galgala Mountains of Bari region.
 March 15 - Three people were killed and two others injured in a grenade attack in Bosaso, the commercial city of Somalia's northeastern Puntland region.
 March 22 - 18 people were killed and 22 others wounded in a car bomb explosion near a hotel in the Somali capital Mogadishu.
 March 25 - At least four people were killed and ten others injured in a suicide car bomb attack near Somalia's parliament headquarters in Mogadishu.
 March 27 - A Somali lawmaker was shot dead by Al-Shabaab assassins in her home in Mogadishu.

September
September 2 - A suicide bombing is carried out in Mogadishu by Al-Shabaab. The blast left 3 people dead.
'''

October

 1 October - A suicide car bomber by the group Al-Shabaab struck an EU convoy carrying Italian soldiers in Mogadishu, killing 2 civilians and injuring at least 5.
 1 October - Islamic state attackers shot dead 3 Ethiopians and injured 4 in Bosaso town, the attackers fled the scene.
 9 October - Al-Shabaab executed 5 people by a firing squad, accused of spying for US and British intelligence forces near the town of Jilib.
 13 October - At least 16 people were killed and 50 were wounded when twin suicide bombings targeted a restaurant and a coffee shop in Baidoa. A grenade was also thrown into a nearby hotel.

See also 
 Somali Civil War (2009–present)

References 

2018 in Somalia
Somalia
Somali Civil War (2009–present) by year
Lists of armed conflicts in 2018